Jerzy Ustupski (1 April 1911 – 3 October 2004) was a Polish rower who competed in the 1936 Summer Olympics.

He was born in Zakopane and died in Zakopane. At the 1936 Summer Olympics he won the bronze medal with his partner Roger Verey in the double sculls competition.

He was a member of the Home Army (Armia Krajowa) during World War II and fought in the Warsaw Uprising in 1944.

References

External links
 profile 

1911 births
2004 deaths
Polish male rowers
Olympic rowers of Poland
Rowers at the 1936 Summer Olympics
Olympic bronze medalists for Poland
Polish resistance members of World War II
Olympic medalists in rowing
Sportspeople from Zakopane
Medalists at the 1936 Summer Olympics
European Rowing Championships medalists